Robert Stewart was a Scottish footballer who played as a right back. He made 260 appearances in the Scottish Cup and Scottish Football League (all in its top division) for Morton during his decade with the Greenock club between 1902 and 1912. Stewart was selected once for the Scottish Football League XI in March 1907; he contributed to a clean sheet for the defence in a 0–0 draw with the Football League XI.

References

19th-century births
Year of birth missing
20th-century deaths
Year of death missing
Scottish footballers
Association football defenders
Greenock Morton F.C. players
Johnstone F.C. players
Scottish Football League players
Scottish Football League representative players